

Appointed governors
1876 Yasuoka Ryosuke
1876-1891 Takaaki Tomioka
1891-1896 Matsudaira Masanao
1896-1898 Ōura Kanetake
1898-1903 Tokuhisa Tsunenori
1903-1907 Egi Kazuyuki
1907-1908 Norikichi Oshikawa
1908-1912 Kawaji Toshikyo
1912 Tadashi Munakata
1912-1913 Kamiyama Mitsunoshin
1913-1914 Tenta Akaboshi
1916-1919 Ōta Masahiro
1919-1921 Hikoji Kawaguchi
1921-1922 Sansuke Nakayama
1922-1923 Tadahiko Okada
1923-1924 Chisato Tanaka
1924-1925 Nakagawa Kenzō
1925-1926 Yoshifumi Satake
1926-1927 Masao Oka
1927-1929 Saito Munenori
1929-1930 Omori Kichigoro
1930-1931 Bunpei Motoyama
1931-1932 Kenichi Yamashita
1932-1935 Keiichi Suzuki (governor of Hiroshima)
1935-1936 Sekiya Nobuyuke
1936-1939 Fujioka Nagakazu
1939-1940 Shunsuke Kondo
1940-1942 Yukizawa Chiyoji
1942-1944 Hikari Akira
1944-1945 Soga Kajimatsu
1945-1946 Hirai Fumi
1946 Hiroshi Nagai
1946-1947 Saburo Sakurai (1st time)

Elected governors
1947 Naoto Suzuki 
1947-1959 Saburo Sakurai (2nd time)
1959-1971 Kosaku Teramoto
1971-1983 Issei Sawada
1983-1991 Morihiro Hosokawa
1991-2000 Joji Fukushima
2000-2008 Yoshiko Shiotani
2008–present Ikuo Kabashima

 
Kumamoto Prefecture